Wong Amat Beach is a beach in northern Pattaya on the east coast of the Gulf of Thailand  from Bangkok in the Chonburi Province. The beach is located on the Naklua Bay peninsula and in 2016 the sea water quality was graded as 'poor' by the Regional Environmental Office.

References

Neighbourhoods of Pattaya